Jin Ju (Shanghai, 1976) is a Chinese-born Italian pianist. Jin Ju studied piano at the Central Conservatory of Music in Beijing and the Accademia Chigiana in Siena. She won the Echo Klassik piano recital award in 2012 for her recording of works by Czerny and Schubert.

Discography  
 Beethoven: Appassionata; Czerny: La Ricordanza. Variations on a favorite theme by Rode op. 33; Franz Schubert: Sonata D 958 c minor. SACD (MDG)
 Chopin: late piano works
 Robert Schumann: Piano music (Fantasia op. 17 C major, Sonata No. 1 op. 11 F sharp minor)
 Chopin: late piano works Vol 2

References

External links
 

1976 births
Italian pianists
Living people
Chinese emigrants to Italy
Musicians from Shanghai
21st-century pianists